Metge is a surname. Notable people with the surname include:

Bernat Metge (c. 1350 – 1410), Catalan writer and humanist
Cedric Metge (1900–1985), New Zealand cricketer
Daniel Metge (born 1970), French screenwriter and film director
Joan Metge (born 1930), New Zealand social anthropologist, educator, lecturer and writer
Lillian Metge (1871–1954), Anglo-Irish suffragette and women's rights campaigner
Peter Metge (c. 1740–1809), Irish politician and judge
René Metge (born 1941), French rally driver
Robert Henry Metge (1850–1900), Irish Home Rule League politician